The 2017 Arkansas–Pine Bluff Golden Lions football team represented the University of Arkansas at Pine Bluff in the 2017 NCAA Division I FCS football season. The Golden Lions were led by 10th-year head coach Monte Coleman and played their home games at Golden Lion Stadium in Pine Bluff, Arkansas as members of the West Division of the Southwestern Athletic Conference (SWAC). The Golden Lions finished the season 2–9, 1–6 in SWAC play to finish in last place in the West Division.

On November 20, head coach Monte Coleman was fired. He finished at APBU with a ten-year record of 40–71.

Preseason 
The Golden Lions were picked to finish in last place in the West Division.

Schedule

References

Arkansas-Pine Bluff
Arkansas–Pine Bluff Golden Lions football seasons
Arkansas-Pine Bluff Golden Lions f